WZZZ (107.5 FM) is a radio station  broadcasting a classic rock format. Licensed to Portsmouth, Ohio, United States, the station is currently owned by Hometown Broadcasting of Portsmouth 2, Inc. and is programmed locally.

History
The station went on the air as WNPM on April 12, 2000.  On December 16, 2002, the station changed its call sign to the current WZZZ.

References

External links

ZZZ
Classic rock radio stations in the United States